The Governor of Luhansk Oblast is the head of the executive branch for the Luhansk Oblast. Due to the current Russo-Ukrainian War, the administration has been assigned as a civil–military administration since 5 March 2015. As a result, the Governor of the Oblast is officially called Head of the Luhansk Regional Military–Civil Administration.

The office of Governor is an appointed position, with officeholders being appointed by the President of Ukraine, on recommendation from the Prime Minister of Ukraine, to serve a four-year term.

The official residence for the Governor was originally located in Luhansk and then relocated to Sievierodonetsk (until its capture by Russian forces in 2022) due to the War in Donbas, since 5 March 2015.

Governors

Chairman of Executive Committee of Donetsk Oblast
For governors of the united region in 1932–38, see Governor of Donetsk Oblast#Chairman of Executive Committee of Donetsk Oblast.
Chairman of Executive Committee of Luhansk (Voroshylovhrad) Oblast
 Petro Bogynya (1938)
 Mykhailo Shevchenko (1938–1942)
 Nazi German occupation (1942–1943)''
 Mykhailo Shevchenko (1943)
 Ivan Oreshko (1943–1947)
 ? (1947–1948)
 Stepan Stetsenko (1948–1950)
 Pylyp Reshetnyak (1950–1960)
 Mykola Gureyev (1960–1963)
 Ivan Ivanenko (1963–1964)
 Mykola Davydenko (1963–1964)
 Mykola Gureyev (1964–1971)
 Mykola Davydenko (1971–1974)
 Viktor Lysytsyn (1974–1981)
 Albert Merzlenko (1981–1986)
 Rid Zveryev (1986–1987)
 Anatoliy Kasyanov (1987–1990)
 Eduard Khananov (1990–1991)
 Anatoliy Kasyanov (1991–1992)

Representative of the President
 Eduard Khananov (1992–1994)

Chairman of the Executive Committee
 Petro Kupin (1994–1995)

Heads of the Administration
 Petro Kupin (1995)
 Hennadiy Fomenko (1995–1998)
 Oleksandr Yefremov (1998–2005)
 Oleksiy Danilov (2005)
 Hennadiy Moskal (2005–2006)
 Oleksandr Kobityev (2006) (acting)
 Oleksandr Antipov (2006–2010)
 Valeriy Holenko (2010)
 Volodymyr Prystyuk (2010–2014)
 Mykhailo Bolotskykh (2014) 
 Iryna Verihina (2014) (acting)
 Hennadiy Moskal (2014–2015)

Head of the Regional Military Civil Administration
 Yuriy Klymenko (2015)
 Heorhiy Tuka (2015–2016)
 Yuriy Harbuz (29 April 2016 – 22 November 2018)
 Serhiy Fil (22 November 2018 – 5 July 2019) (acting)
 Vitaliy Komarnytskyi (5 July – 25 October 2019)
 Serhiy Haidai (25 October 2019 - 15 March 2023)

See also
 Luhansk Regional Committee of the Communist Party of Ukraine

Notes

References

External links
 World Statesmen.org
Government of Luhansk Oblast in Ukrainian

 
Luhansk Oblast